Giant Drop may refer to:

 The Giant Drop, an Intamin drop tower at Dreamworld in Gold Coast, Australia
 Giant Drop (Six Flags Great America), an Intamin drop tower at Six Flags Great America in Gurnee, Illinois